Niru Devi Pal (also Neeru) is a Nepali communist politician and a member of the House of Representatives of the federal parliament of Nepal. She was elected under the proportional representation system from CPN UML filling the reserved seat for women, for Kanchanpur district. Representing the newly formed Nepal Communist Party (NCP) in the parliament, she also chairs the parliamentary Women and Social Committee.

She was allegedly threatened by a group of people when out grocery-shopping in Mid-Baneshwar on July 31, 2018. A large number of police personnel had been mobilised and as many as 75  had been arrested for further investigation by August 2, 16 of whom had been held, post preliminary screening. There was no further progress reported on the case, and by mid-November, there were reports that the whole incident was a hoax.

References

Living people
Place of birth missing (living people)
People from Kanchanpur District
21st-century Nepalese women politicians
21st-century Nepalese politicians
Nepal Communist Party (NCP) politicians
Communist Party of Nepal (Unified Marxist–Leninist) politicians
Nepal MPs 2017–2022
1971 births